Veatch is a Scottish surname, a variant of Veitch. Notable people with the surname include:

Dan Veatch (born 1965), American swimmer
Greg Veatch, American soccer player
Henry Babcock Veatch (1911–1999), American philosopher
James C. Veatch (1819–1895), American lawyer, politician and Union Army general
Nathan Thomas Veatch (1886-1975), American engineer and businessperson.  Founder and Managing Partner, Black & Veatch
John Veatch (1808–1870), American scientist
Robert M. Veatch (1843-1925), American politician and businessperson
Sarah Veatch, American biophysicist

References

Scottish surnames